Madhya Pradesh State Highway 19 (MP SH 19) is a State Highway running from Porsa town near MP-UP border via Mehgaon, Datia, Narwar, Sultanpur, Bareli, Piparia, Matkuli, Tamia, Parasia and terminates at Chhindwara city.
It is an important highway which connects important towns of Northern Madhya Pradesh and Southern Madhya Pradesh.

A branch of this highway named MP SH 19A goes to Pachmarhi from Matkuli.

See also
List of state highways in Madhya Pradesh

References

State Highways in Madhya Pradesh